Ahmed Sabry (born June 23, 1985) is an Egyptian professional footballer who currently plays as a right midfielder for the Egyptian club El Raja SC.

Sabry previously played for El Sharkia, Haras El Hodoud, and Tala'ea El-Gaish. In July 2017, he moved to El-Entag El-Harby in a free transfer with 2-year contract, but after few days, Sabry and El-Entag reached an agreement to cancel the contract. In August 2017, he signed a 2-year contract for El Raja SC, a promoted team to 2017–18 Egyptian Premier League.

References

 

1985 births
Living people
Egyptian footballers
Association football midfielders
Haras El Hodoud SC players
Tala'ea El Gaish SC players
El Raja SC players